Nasi Lemak 2.0 ( 2.0) is a Malaysian film directed by and starring rapper Wee Meng Chee, known more by his stage name Namewee. The sequel, Nasi Lemak 1.0 was released 11 years later on 27 January 2022.

The low-budget film premiered in Melbourne, Australia, on the 31st of August, also known as Malaysia's National Day, then later to Malaysian cinemas on 8 September 2011.

Plot
A young chef, Huang Da Xia (Namewee) struggles to get the patrons he's looking for. However, contradicting his unpopular cuisine, he is also well known as "Hero Huang" in the local neighbourhood, because he carries out good deeds in helping the community, including filming videos and putting them on his YouTube account. One day, he meets Xiao K (Karen Kong), who asks for his help. Xiao K's father, owner of a famous Chinese restaurant, is fighting with her aunt for the ownership of the restaurant. After some complicated discussions, they decide to hold a contest to see who can cook the best Chinese dish. Desperate to get his life and the restaurant business back on track, Chef Huang decides to help Xiao K. Huang seeks help from a mysterious hawker stall lady (Adibah Noor), who summons him to embark on an extraordinary journey of his life. During this self-enlightening experience, he will also meet many "local heroes", each lending their support to help him rediscover his roots and the real hidden message of "Nasi Lemak".

Cast

Development 
On 17 March 2010, Wee announced at a small media event that he was going to make a movie. He applied for funds from the Malaysian government, which he recorded on film. After multiple unsuccessful attempts, he vowed to meet the Prime Minister of Malaysia, Najib Razak. Wee met the Prime Minister of Malaysia about producing the film, stressing to him that the movie promoted the spirit of Najib's 1Malaysia program.

The film's executive producer, Fred Chong, said that the movie had the full support from Minister Datuk Seri Nazri Aziz, a member of the Prime Minister's office, who had issued an official letter endorsing it as a "1Malaysia film". However, protesters objected to the film and its maker, which prompted Wee to post on his Facebook page about his concerns that the movie would be banned in Malaysia.

Wee spent nearly a year applying for loans so film production would commence, but his applications were rejected. Nevertheless, under a low budget and under the absence of government funding, he continued on his film which took about two months including post-editing. The film was then handed over to the National Censorship Board.

On 10 October, the National Film Development Corporation Malaysia (Finas) declared that the movie is not entitled to a 20% tax rebate under its new incentive for local films, because it did not qualify for mandatory screening status.

On 26 June 2011, Wee announced that the movie would be in theatres on 8 September. Soon after, the trailer was released on his YouTube channel.

Reception

2.0 is the first film in Malaysia to portray the country's three major races in an ensemble manner. The response was mixed. This is the first Malaysian film that did not target one of the three population groups as its audience. A survey conducted by major bloggers and entertainment tabloids claimed that most of its audience loved the style of acting, because they could relate to the characters.

Box-office 
In an interview with AFP, co-producer Fred Chong said that the movie made more than MYR1.5 million during the first four days of release.

Controversy 
There was little protest done against the movie's screening, one occasion that took place in Ipoh was done by a group who called themselves the Pertubuhan Gagasan Rakyat Didahulukan Negeri Perak (The Perak People First Alliance Society).

On 21 September 2011, an Utusan Malaysia article had condemned Namewee for the film which was claimed to have insulted the national anthem Negaraku, Islam and Malay race as a whole. Namewee responded that the author had passed judgement on his movie without looking at it as a whole, for misunderstanding it and for missing its intent to unify the races across Malaysia. Namewee's response led some protesters to push for Utusan Malaysia to lodge an official police report against him.

See also
 Nasi lemak

References

External links 
 
 

2011 films
Malaysian comedy films
Tamil-language Malaysian films
Films directed by Namewee
Grand Brilliance films
Cantonese-language Malaysian films
Hokkien-language films
Chinese-language Malaysian films
2011 directorial debut films
2010s English-language films
2010s Mandarin-language films